

311001–311100 

|-bgcolor=#f2f2f2
| colspan=4 align=center | 
|}

311101–311200 

|-id=119
| 311119 Pacner ||  || Karel Pacner (1936–2021) was a Czech science journalist and writer interested in cosmonautics. He attended the 1969 launch of Apollo 11 as the only Czech journalist. Pacner correctly described events and people from both the Soviet and American sides of the space race, as well as later cooperation in space. || 
|}

311201–311300 

|-id=231
| 311231 Anuradhapura ||  || Anuradhapura is a UNESCO World Heritage Site, situated in north-central Sri Lanka and was the capital city of the island for over a millennium. || 
|}

311301–311400 

|-bgcolor=#f2f2f2
| colspan=4 align=center | 
|}

311401–311500 

|-bgcolor=#f2f2f2
| colspan=4 align=center | 
|}

311501–311600 

|-bgcolor=#f2f2f2
| colspan=4 align=center | 
|}

311601–311700 

|-bgcolor=#f2f2f2
| colspan=4 align=center | 
|}

311701–311800 

|-id=785
| 311785 Erwanmazarico ||  || Erwan M. Mazarico (born 1982), a planetary scientist. || 
|}

311801–311900 

|-bgcolor=#f2f2f2
| colspan=4 align=center | 
|}

311901–312000 

|-id=957
| 311957 Barryalbright ||  || Barry Albright (born 1957) is an American paleontologist and professor. Albright specializes in paleomagnetism and has done extensive work on the paleomagnetic stratigraphy of Cretaceous strata in southern Utah. He has also described new plesiosaur genera from the Western Interior Seaway. || 
|}

References 

311001-312000